Choghamish Rural District is a rural district (dehestan) in Choghamish District, Dezful County, Khuzestan Province, Iran. At the 2006 census, its population was 15,041, in 3,004 families.  The rural district has 15 villages.

References 

Rural Districts of Khuzestan Province
Dezful County